Boripe is a Local Government Area in Osun State, Nigeria. Its headquarters are in the town of Iragbiji.

The postal code of the area is 230.

References

Local Government Areas in Osun State